Nina Ilyinichna Preobrazhenskaya (born 16 February 1956) is a Soviet rower. She first competed, under her maiden name Nina Antoniuk, at an international level at the 1977 World Rowing Championships in Amsterdam, Netherlands, where she won silver with the women's eight. At the subsequent championships in 1978 and 1979, she became world champion in that boat glass. At the 1980 Summer Olympics, she won a silver medal with the women's eight.

References 

 

1956 births
Living people
People from Stavyshche
Ukrainian female rowers
Soviet female rowers
Rowers at the 1980 Summer Olympics
Olympic silver medalists for the Soviet Union
Olympic rowers of the Soviet Union
Olympic medalists in rowing
Medalists at the 1980 Summer Olympics
World Rowing Championships medalists for the Soviet Union
Sportspeople from Kyiv Oblast